The 1809 Connecticut gubernatorial election took place on April 10, 1809.

Incumbent Federalist Governor Jonathan Trumbull Jr. won re-election to a twelfth term, defeating Democratic-Republican nominee Asa Spalding with 63.81% of the vote.

General election

Candidates
Asa Spalding, Democratic-Republican, attorney, Democratic-Republican nominee for Lieutenant Governor in 1804, 1805, 1806, 1807 and 1808, Democratic-Republican nominee for U.S. Senate in 1807 special election
Jonathan Trumbull Jr., Federalist, incumbent Governor

Results

Notes

References

Gubernatorial
Connecticut
1809